Pavel Petrovich Sokolov (Russian: Павел Петрович Соколов; (1826—1905) was a Russian  watercolor painter and illustrator. His brothers, Pyotr and Alexander, were also well-known artists.

Biography
His father was the portrait painter, Pyotr Sokolov. He studied at the Imperial Academy of Arts with Karl Bryullov and was awarded the title of "Free Artist". In 1864, his painting of the Holy Family earned him the title of "Academician".

Most of his works were watercolors. His painting "Troika" was purchased by Tsar Alexander II and several were acquired by the noble Stenbok-Fermor family.

He was also a prolific illustrator; primarily for Всемирная иллюстрация (Illustration World) and similar publications.

Both he and his father were great admirers of Pushkin so, from 1855 to 1860, he created  pencil-drawn illustrations for Eugene Onegin and The Captain's Daughter. They met approval from Pushkin's friends and have proven to be very popular.

Selected works

References

External links

1826 births
1905 deaths
19th-century painters from the Russian Empire
Russian male painters
Russian illustrators
19th-century male artists from the Russian Empire